The Raden Eddy Martadinata class of guided-missile frigates of the Indonesian Navy are SIGMA 10514 types of the Netherlands-designed Sigma family of modular naval vessels, named after Indonesian Admiral Raden Eddy Martadinata. The frigates are each built from six modules or sections, four built at the PT PAL shipyard at Surabaya, the other two at Damen Schelde Naval Shipbuilding in the Netherlands.

These warships were designed as multi-mission frigates, able to fulfill the anti-aircraft warfare role with surface-to-air missiles, anti-surface warfare with Exocet missiles, anti-submarine warfare with hull mounted sonar, torpedoes and ASW Helicopters.

History
On 5 June 2012, the Indonesian Ministry of Defense officially signed a procurement contract with DSNS to build the first Sigma 10514 frigate for the Indonesian Navy with a value of $220 million. The procurement of this ship aims to strengthen the Indonesian Navy's arsenal and provide a deterrent effect on any party who intends to disrupt Indonesia's sovereignty and territorial integrity. The Transfer of Technology (ToT) scheme was applied during the construction of this ship to PT PAL Indonesia. On February 2013, a contract for the construction of the second Sigma frigate was signed.

KRI Raden Eddy Martadinata (331), lead ship of her class, was commissioned on 7 April 2017 at Tanjung Priok. The second ship, KRI I Gusti Ngurah Rai (332), was launched in September 2016. I Gusti Ngurah Rai was delivered on 30 October 2017. On 2 November 2017, it was reported that there was still work that needed to be completed in both Indonesia and the Netherlands before the ship will be ready for service. There will also be an estimated three-month training period for her crew as well. The second frigate was commissioned on 10 January 2018.

These ship were built without several of their main system and equipment fitted, namely VL-MICA surface-to-air missile, MM40 Exocet block III anti-ship missile, Rheinmetall Millennium close-in weapon system and their main electronic warfare system (ECM/ESM). They were planned to be installed later on (FFBNW) during their lifetime. The class finally received their full complement of FFBNW system and equipment in December 2019 for KRI Raden Eddy Martadinata (331) and March 2020 for KRI I Gusti Ngurah Rai (332).

Characteristics
These ships are equipped with modern weaponry equipment integrated into the combat management system (CMS). In addition, she also has a stealth design such as low radar cross section, low infrared signature, low noise signature, making her more difficult to be detected by other ships' radars. She is also capable of conducting surface, air, underwater, and electronic warfare.

Ships of class

Gallery

References

Frigates of the Indonesian Navy
 
Frigate classes
Frigates of the Netherlands
Indonesia–Netherlands relations